Tses railway station is a railway station serving the town of Tses in Namibia.  It is part of the TransNamib Railway, and is located along the Windhoek to Upington line that connects Namibia with South Africa.

See also 

 Railway stations in Namibia

References 

Railway stations in Namibia
TransNamib Railway